The Islamic College of Brisbane (ICB) is a co-educational P-12 school in the suburb of Karawatha, City of Brisbane,  Queensland, Australia. It offers teaching from Prep year to year twelve.

The school is a project of Australian Federation of Islamic Councils (AFIC) and is registered with the Department of Education. It was founded by both Queensland and Federal governments and has accreditation to enrol both local and overseas students.

School Motto
The motto of the Islamic College of Brisbane is "Seek Knowledge"

This apothegm was adapted from a famous hadith in which the Prophet Muhammad is reported to have said:

"Seek knowledge from the cradle to the grave".

ICB and the AFIC
In 2015, a long-running dispute between the College and the Australian Federation of Islamic Councils, which owns the land, has resulted in members of the school board and principal being dismissed or resigning.  The college has been asked to show-cause that it, "complies with registration and accreditation requirements".

In May 2015 it was reported that Queensland police are investigating a claim made by a former principal that moneys have been removed from school accounts and school loans had been falsified, with possibly up to $1 million involved.  A senior officer of the AFIC has been implicated.

In February 2016 it was reported that a federal government audit uncovered that millions of dollars had been improperly passed from school to the Australian Federation of Islamic Councils.

Notable alumni
 Yassmin Abdel-Magied

See also
Australian Federation of Islamic Councils
Islam in Australia
Islamic organisations in Australia
Islamic schools and branches

References

Private secondary schools in Brisbane
Islamic schools in Australia
Educational institutions established in 1995
1995 establishments in Australia